Canada and Indonesia established diplomatic relations in 1952. Canada has an embassy in Jakarta while Indonesia maintains an embassy in Ottawa. Indonesia also has consulates in Toronto and Vancouver. Canada and Indonesia are partners in a number of multilateral organizations, such as Asia-Pacific Economic Cooperation (APEC), the G-20, Cairns Group, and the World Trade Organization (WTO).

According to a 2013 BBC World Service Poll, 49% of Indonesians view Canada's influence positively, with 16% expressing a negative view.

History

Indonesia-Canada diplomatic relations formally began when the two countries signed an agreement to open diplomatic missions in their respective capitals on October 9, 1952. However, relations between the two countries started in 1948, when Indonesia was struggling to gain international recognition for its independence from its former colonial power in 1945. Canada, through General Andrew McNaughton as the President of the United Nations' Security Council, managed to break the deadlock in the negotiation on resolving the conflict between Indonesia and the Netherlands that resulted in the adoption of Resolution 67/1949, which endorsed the establishment of a Dutch–Indonesian Round Table Conference. Tripartite negotiations lead to the international recognition of Indonesia's sovereignty in December 1949.

Relations have been generally cordial. Both countries shared similar views on the Archipelagic state principle during negotiations on the United Nations Convention on the Law of the Sea. Indonesia and Canada were both members of the International Commission of Control and Supervision in Vietnam. Differences emerged in the 1990s over human rights issues and the East Timor dispute. In the Post-Suharto era these irritants have been removed.

Development assistance
Canada began to support economic development in Indonesia through the Colombo Plan during the 1950s. For thirty years between 1967 and 2007, Canada provided aid to Indonesia within the international coordination arrangements established under the Inter-Governmental Group on Indonesia and the Consultative Group on Indonesia. As a development partner, Canada works closely with Indonesia to support sustainable economic growth and  reduce vulnerability to poverty. The Canadian International Development Agency (CIDA) managed Canada's bilateral program for development assistance to Indonesia until it was folded into Global Affairs Canada. CIDA made Indonesia a major "country of concentration" for Canadian development cooperation, with Indonesia ranked as high as second place among Canadian aid recipients in the 1980s. Canadian support for Indonesian development continues at a lower level.

Trade

Data from the Indonesian Investment Coordinating Board shows Canadian investment in Indonesia for the period of 2005 up to 2011 consisted of 37 projects worth US$157 million. The major sector both by number of projects and investment value is the mining industry. The largest number of Canadian investment projects are on the island of Java, but the largest dollar value of investment is located in Sulawesi.

See also
 Indonesian Canadian

External links
 The Embassy of Republic of Indonesia in Ottawa, Canada
 The Embassy of Canada in Jakarta, Indonesia

References

 
Bilateral relations of Indonesia
Indonesia